Alain Olivier Niyungeko (born 10 October 1970) is a Burundian football coach, who was last manager of Burundi.

Managerial career
During the 2012–13 season, Niyungeko led Flambeau de l'Est to their first Burundi Premier League title, three years after formation.

In 2016, Niyungeko was appointed manager of Burundi, replacing Ahcene Aït-Abdelmalek.

References

1970 births
Living people
Burundian sportsmen
Burundi national football team managers
Burundian football managers
2019 Africa Cup of Nations managers